The following is a list of the stations on the Brescia Metro, a rapid transit system in Brescia, Italy.

Operational

Phase 2 (planned)

Branch 1
Fiera
Orzinuovi 2
Orzinuovi 1
Rodi
Lamarmora (connection with Phase 1)

Branch 2
Inzino
Gardone
Zanano
Sarezzo
Villa Carcina
Cailina
San Vigilio
Concesio
Stocchetta
Prealpino (connection with Phase 1)

External links
 Official website of the Brescia Metrobus (in Italian)

Brescia Metro
Brescia